Pietrykaw or Petrikov is a town in Gomel Region, Belarus. It serves as the administrative center of Pietrykaw District.

At the 2009 census, its population was 10,591.

Geography

History

Before 1500, the history of Pietrykaw is that of the Principality of Turov and Pinsk. Thus it passed under control of the Kingdom of Galicia–Volhynia in the early 13th century, and was devastated in 1240 by the Mongols, and thereafter remained under the titular control of the Golden Horde until it joined the Grand Duchy of Lithuania in the early 14th century, just before Poland conquered the Kingdom of Galicia–Volhynia in 1349.  In 1502 and 1521 the area was attacked by Tatars from the newly independent Crimean Khanate.

The first written mention of Pietrykaw goes back to the year 1523, where the community was under the Olelkovich family's Duchy of Slutsk–Kapyl, part of the Grand Duchy of Lithuania. The town became part of the Polish–Lithuanian Commonwealth in 1569, and so remained until its annexation by the Russian Empire at the second partition of Poland in 1793. Pietrykaw was administratively placed in the Mozyrsky Uyezd of Minsk Governorate. By the 19th century, it had come under the control of the Chodkiewicz noble Russian family.

In 1900, Pietrykaw was located in the area of the Russian Empire that allowed resident Jews and had a Jewish community of 2,151, 38.8% of the total population. The town was occupied by the Germans in World War I. It was occupied by the Poles in 1920-1921, during the Polish-Soviet War. Pietrykaw received its status as a town in 1923. During World War II, the town was occupied by the Germans and the Jewish community was exterminated.

Pietrykaw was taken from the Germans on 30 June 1944 as part of Operation Bagration by the soldiers of the 55th Mozyr Red Rifle Division of the 61st Army of the 1st Belorussian Front and sailors of the 20th Brigade of the Dnieper Flotilla. More than 3,000 casualties were suffered by the Soviet troops during the battle for Pietrykaw.

Pietrykaw is located in the area affected by the Chernobyl disaster.

Economy
Among the first industries in Pietrykaw were the construction of barges for the river traffic and a brick factory. During the Soviet era the shipyard was expanded and various small manufacturing plants were built, including a bread factory. The town depends upon both river traffic and road traffic for much of its livelihood. There are good road connections with Gomel, Brest and Mazyr.  There is no bridge across the Pripyat, but there is regular ferry service.

The regional newspaper Петрыкаўскія навіны ("Pietrykaw News") is published there.

References

Towns in Belarus
Populated places in Gomel Region
Minsk Voivodeship
Mozyrsky Uyezd
Holocaust locations in Belarus
Pietrykaw District